Dorcoeax is a genus of longhorn beetles of the subfamily Lamiinae.

 Dorcoeax bituberosoides (Breuning, 1969)
 Dorcoeax jadoti Téocchi, 2001
 Dorcoeax ovalis Breuning, 1946

References

Ancylonotini